Karbi Anglong plateau is an extension of the Indian peninsular plateau  in the Assam, North Eastern state of India. This area receives maximum rainfall from the Southwest summer Monsoon from June through September.

Geography
Karbi Anglong Plateau is pear-shaped. It has an area of about 7000 km2. It link with Meghalaya Plateau towards the south through a patch of low uneven terrain.

See also
 Mikir Hills

References

Karbi Anglong district
Plateaus of India
Landforms of Assam